Gymnogongrus is a genus of red algae belonging to the family Phyllophoraceae.

The genus has cosmopolitan distribution.

Species:

Gymnogongrus chiton 
Gymnogongrus crenulatus 
Gymnogongrus crustiforme
Gymnogongrus devoniensis
Gymnogongrus disciplinaris
Gymnogongrus foliosus 
Gymnogongrus griffithsiae 
Gymnogongrus johnstoni
Gymnogongrus leptophyllus 
Gymnogongrus linearis 
Gymnogongrus martinensis
Gymnogongrus norvegicus 
Gymnogongrus patens 
Gymnogongrus platyphyllus
Gymnogongrus tenuis 
Gymnogongrus vermicularis

References

Phyllophoraceae
Red algae genera